The Zongshen 200 GS, also known as Xplorer z200, zs200GS or 200GS, is the first of Zongshen, Chongqing Group's sport touring bikes. It was first introduced worldwide in 2004, and is still sold by Zongshen distributors in different countries, despite the release in 2006 of the second Zongshen 250 GS.

Brand names
The bike is distributed under various brand names:

Design
 
Zongshen designed the 200GS as economical sport touring bike. A dedicated single-cylinder four-stroke 200 cc engine was chosen for increased fuel mileage, using a push rod valve system for long-distance engine endurance, eliminating risks of timing chain failure due to excess heat during long-distance travel. The push rod design reduces its top speed, allowing a maximum of  speed capability. Pushing the z200 to very high rpms increase the risk of valve float. The 200GS push-rod engine uses early Honda technology. Owners in the Philippines discovered that many engine parts are compatible or interchangeable with the parts of a Honda TMX-155 engine.

The design uses heavy sports aerodynamics for stability on highways, and a high capacity fuel tank. The engine is air-cooled, requiring the half-fairing design for proper air flow. The starter clutch will break down easily with longer pressing of the starter switch during automatic start.

The 200GS does not have ports for saddle-bags, and does not include touring accessories upon purchase.

Specifications & performance statistics

External links
Zongshen main site
Zongshen America
EastWorld Motors Ind. Corp.

References

200 GS
Sport touring motorcycles
Motorcycles introduced in 2004